Methylamine-corrinoid protein Co-methyltransferase (mtmB (gene), monomethylamine methyltransferase) is an enzyme with systematic name monomethylamine:5-hydroxybenzimidazolylcobamide Co-methyltransferase. This enzyme catalyses the following chemical reaction

 methylamine + [Co(I) methylamine-specific corrinoid protein]  [methyl-Co(III) methylamine-specific corrinoid protein] + ammonia

This enzyme is involved in methanogenesis from methylamine.

References

External links 
 

EC 2.1.1